Charlie Cole may refer to:

 Charlie Cole (lawyer) (born 1927), American lawyer, attorney general of Alaska 1990–1994
 Charlie Cole (photographer) (1955–2019), American photographer who took the picture of the Tank Man during the 1989 Tiananmen Square protests
 Charlie Cole (rower) (born 1986), American rower who competed in the 2012 Olympics

See also
 Charles Cole (disambiguation)